Sally Lightfoot may refer to:
Grapsus grapsus, a semi-terrestrial crab species from South America
Percnon gibbesi, a marine crab species found in the Pacific and Atlantic Oceans, and in the Mediterranean Sea

Animal common name disambiguation pages